Powderhall Stadium formerly the Powderhall Grounds was a greyhound racing track in Edinburgh, Scotland. It was located on Beaverhall Road, in the Powderhall (Broughton) area of northern Edinburgh, beside the Water of Leith. The track closed in 1995 and the site is now a housing estate.

Origins
The Powderhall Grounds was built in 1869 and gained fame for being the place where Olympian Eric Liddell, portrayed in Chariots of Fire, trained in the 1920s. The stadium was converted for greyhound racing (opening on 3 August 1927) and football one year later, in 1928, when it hosted the original Edinburgh City football team.

Greyhound racing

Pre WWII history
When opened in 1927 the track had easy bends and long straights and over 10,000 attended the first meeting. The first race, the Leith Stakes was won by Eager Hands in 30.70 over 500 yards. The Greyhound Racing Association (GRA) acquired Powderhall becoming one of 19 GRA tracks at the time.
The kennels were built on the west side of the stadium replacing an old football ground.

Major success was achieved in 1928 when Boher Ash trained by Tommy Johnston Sr. won the English Greyhound Derby, the first and only time a Scottish trained greyhound would win the sports premier event. The track situated below the 'Puddockie' as it was known locally (the Water of Leith) and a culvert ran under the track to allow the Puddockie to flow. The track circumference was 440 yards and facilities included a grandstand and two covered enclosures. The original hare was an outside 'bogie' and distances were 440, 500 and 700 yards but despite the culvert the track was prone to flooding. Edinburgh hosted four greyhound tracks, Stenhouse Stadium, Marine Gardens and a short lived independent track called Royal Gymnasium. The track introduced its own major event in 1933 and called it the Edinburgh Cup which saw early winners including Jesmond Cutlet, Wattle Bark and Dante II.

Post war history

The venue was selected to host the Stewards Cup on several occasions and also hosted the BBC Television Trophy in 1964. In 1970 the stadium underwent renovation including a new 100 'Silver Hound' seated restaurant with a glass plated front to allow public viewing and bar areas increased to a total of seven. Bill Glennie was General Manager and Bill Mulley was Racing Manager replaced by Stuart Strachan in 1978
A heated blanket was constructed underneath the track to combat the Scottish winter and allow racing to go ahead during particularly cold spells.

The Scottish Grand National and Scottish St Leger both became popular events and in 1982 trainer Graham Mann was moved by the GRA to White City and his replacement was Jane Glass, the Scottish tracks first ever female trainer. Powderhall marked its 60th anniversary with a new £400,000 grandstand and in 1987 the track was handed the Scottish Greyhound Derby by the GRA (following problems at Shawfield), the first time the event was run outside of Glasgow.

After hosting the 1988 Scottish Derby the GRA sold the track to local businessman Norrie Rowan for £1.8m, the sale of the track resulted in two problems, the first was the fact that they lost the rights to hold the Scottish Derby because the GRA no longer had any investments in Scotland so the Derby returned to Glasgow. Secondly Norrie Rowan sold the track on to Coral for £2.2 million an instant profit of £400,000. During 1990 Rowan expressed the desire to buy the stadium back.

The locally trained Ravage Again nearly surpassed the Ballyregan Bob world record in 1990; trained by Willie Frew the 29 successive wins sequence came to an end on 26 January 1990.

Closure
Corals sold the stadium to Eddie Ramsay in 1992 for £3 million but his company SGRC (Scottish Greyhound Racing Company) was in financial difficulties and he sold it to a Channel Islands company called Charlotte Twenty-One (that included a shareholder called Walton
Hankinson, a housing development specialist) during January 1995 for £3 million. The stadium closed in 1995  and was demolished for housing.

Other sports
Powderhall was also used for football, being the home ground of Leith Athletic from 1926 to 1928 and Edinburgh City from 1931 to 1934. It later became a venue for motorcycle speedway, with the Edinburgh Monarchs racing there from 1977 until 1995.

Two rugby union internationals were played there: Scotland defeated Ireland in the 1897 Home Nations Championship and drew with England in 1898.

The Powderhall Sprint, first held in 1870, was a professional footrace with handicapping of the runners. It continues, since 1999, as the New Year Sprint and is now held at Musselburgh Racecourse.

Competitions

Scottish Greyhound Derby

Edinburgh Cup

Scottish Grand National
The Scottish Grand National was a competition held over hurdles from 1954 until the stadium closed. 

TR (Track record), 1954-1994 (500 yards, 465 metres), 1971-1973 (Not held)

Scottish St Leger
The Scottish St Leger was a competition held from 1959 until the stadium closed.

TR (Track record), 1954-1994 (700 yards, 650 metres), 1982-1983 (Not held)

Track records

Pre Metric record

Post Metric records

+ track alterations

References

External links
Powderhall Stadium, pictures at Speedway Plus
Powderhall Stadium, Defunct Speedway Tracks
Powderhall Stadium, Royal Commission on the Ancient and Historical Monuments of Scotland
A History of Powderhall, Powderhall Village Owners' Association

Defunct greyhound racing venues in the United Kingdom
Defunct speedway venues in Scotland
Defunct sports venues in Scotland
Motorsport venues in Scotland
Sports venues in Edinburgh
Leith Athletic F.C.
Scottish Football League venues
Defunct football venues in Scotland
Greyhound racing in Scotland
Edinburgh City F.C. (1928)
Sports venues completed in 1927
Football venues in Edinburgh